MS Stena Scandinavica is a large cruiseferry operated by Stena Line on the overnight Gothenburg – Kiel route, together with MS Stena Germanica (2000).

Sister ships
Stena Scandinavica is the first of two identical ships built by Hyundai Heavy Industries, for Stena Line.  Her sister ship is Stena Adventurer which operates between Holyhead and Dublin.

References

Ferries of Sweden
Ferries of Germany
2002 ships
Ships built by Hyundai Heavy Industries Group
Scandinavica 2003